The San Francisco Grand Prix was a road cycling race held in San Francisco, United States in early September. It was as a 1.HC event and in 2005 part of the UCI America Tour. It lasted five years.

The difficulties were the Fillmore and Taylor street climbs, short but steep, both an average 18% forcing riders to weave to get to the top. A month after the 2005 race plans for 2006 were abandoned because of economic and political problems.

Winners

External links

Official website

UCI America Tour races
Recurring sporting events established in 2001
2001 establishments in California
Recurring sporting events disestablished in 2005
Cycle races in the United States
Defunct cycling races in the United States
2005 disestablishments in California